Dmitry Pletnyov may refer to:
 Dmitry Pletnyov (doctor) (1871/1872–1941), Russian doctor
 Dmitry Pletnyov (footballer) (born 1998), Russian football player